Nakshathra Nagesh is an Indian actress and television host who has worked in Tamil films and television shows.

Career 
Nakshathra was schooled at Chettinad Vidyashram in Chennai. She studied hotel management at IHM, before moving into the entertainment industry as a video jockey. She first worked on Thanthi TV by hosting the show Vaanavil before moving on to work as a host on television shows such as Sun Singer for Sun TV, and as an awards host for ceremonies such as Sun Kudumbam Viruthugal and the South Indian International Movie Awards. Nakshatra also acted in short films such as En Iniye Pon Nilave, while also making appearances in small roles in the feature films, Settai (2013) and Vaayai Moodi Pesavum (2014). She then appeared alongside an ensemble cast in Balaji Mohan's web series, As I'm Suffering From Kadhal, which marked one of the first Tamil language web-series. A reviewer noted that Nakshatra "looks fantastic and plays her role perfectly."

Nakshatra subsequently took on a leading role in Khushbu's television series Lakshmi Stores, which marked her first lead appearance on a primetime Tamil television drama. Portraying the timid Bhagyalakshmi, Nakshatra won critical acclaim for her portrayal of the character. In 2018, she was also listed by the Chennai Times as the fourth most "desirable woman on television".

Personal life 
Nakshathra got engaged to Raghav in early 2021, and they married on 9 December 2021.

Filmography

Films

Short films

Television

Shows

TV serials

Web series

Awards & nominations

References

External links 
 

Living people
Actresses in Tamil cinema
Indian film actresses
21st-century Indian actresses
Indian television actresses
Actresses in Tamil television
Year of birth missing (living people)